Mahabubnagar mandal is one of the 64 mandals in Mahabubnagar district of the Indian state of Telangana. It is under the administration of Mahabubnagar revenue division and the headquarters are located at Mahabubnagar. The mandal is bounded by Nawabpet, Jadcherla, Bhoothpur, Addakal, Hanwada, Koilkonda and Devarakadra mandals.

Towns and villages 

 census, the mandal has 43 settlements. It includes 2 towns and 41 villages.

The settlements in the mandal are listed below:

Note: M-Municipality, CT–Census town, OG–Out growth, R–Rural

See also 
 List of mandals in Telangana

References 

Mandals in Mahbubnagar district